Samoa Field Airport formerly Eureka Municipal Airport  is a city-owned, public airport  west of Eureka, on the northern peninsula of Humboldt Bay in Humboldt County, California, United States.

Facilities

Sixty percent of its flights are local and 40% are transient. In the year ending December 3, 2004 the airport had 5,000 aircraft operations, an average of 13 per day. Eighteen aircraft were then based at the airport: 89% single-engine and 11% ultralight.

15 city maintained hangars are available at the airport.

The airport is within walking distance to the Pacific Ocean.

Humboldt Bay Social Club is located near the Airport and offers Bar and Restaurant, Vacation rentals, hotel suites and event spaces. No other services are at or near the airport.

World War II
The field  was built as a blimp and seaplane base during World War II called Eureka Auxiliary Field.

Other local airports 
 Arcata-Eureka Airport
 Kneeland Airport
 Murray Field
 Rohnerville Airport

References

External links 

 Some history of Samoa Field,  City of Eureka
 Samoa Field, SkyVector
 , Humboldt Bay Social Club
 

Airports in Humboldt County, California
Buildings and structures in Eureka, California